Jüri Arrak (24 October 1936 – 16 October 2022) was an Estonian painter, whose works with distinguished and recognizable style have won acclaim around the world.

Arrak was born in Tallinn on 24 October 1936, and graduated from the Estonian State Art Institute.  He was a member of the Estonian Artists' Association and a member of the European Academy of Sciences and Arts.

Arrak's works are represented in Estonian Museum of Art, Tallinn, Estonia; Museum of Modern Art, New York, USA; New Orleans Museum of Art, USA; Tretyakov Gallery, Moscow, Russia, and the Ludwig Art Museum, Cologne, Germany.

Arrak died on 16 October 2022, eight days before his 86th birthday.

Awards
Arrak was awarded the II Class of Order of the White Star by the President of Estonia in 2000.

References

1936 births
2022 deaths
Artists from Tallinn
Estonian Academy of Arts alumni
Members of the European Academy of Sciences and Arts
20th-century Estonian painters
20th-century Estonian male artists
21st-century Estonian painters
Recipients of the Order of the White Star, 2nd Class
21st-century Estonian male artists